KPYT-LP (100.3 FM, "Yoeme Radio") is a radio station licensed to serve Tucson, Arizona.  The station is owned by the Pascua Yaqui Tribe. It airs a Variety format and serves the Pascua Yaqui Reservation. The station is an affiliate of Native Public Media. Hector Youtsey is the manager and director of KPYT-LP.

The station was assigned the KPYT-LP call letters by the Federal Communications Commission on September 12, 2005, after beginning operations of June 12 of that year.

See also
 List of community radio stations in the United States

References

External links
 Official Website
 
 KPYT-LP service area per the FCC database

PYT-LP
PYT-LP
Native American radio
Pascua Yaqui Tribe
Mass media in Pima County, Arizona
Community radio stations in the United States
Radio stations established in 2005